This list of the Mesozoic life of Oregon contains the various prehistoric life-forms whose fossilized remains have been reported from within the US state of Oregon and are between 252.17 and 66 million years of age.

A

 †Acanthocircus
 †Acanthocircus carinatus – or unidentified related form
 †Acanthocircus rotundus – or unidentified related form
 †Acanthodiscus
 †Acanthodiscus subradiatus – or unidentified related form
  †Actinoceramus
 †Actinoceramus salomoni
 †Actinoceramus subsulcatus
 †Actinoceramus sulcatus
 †Agerchlamys
 †Agerchlamys boellingi
 †Alpinophragmium – tentative report
 †Amblysiphonella
 †Amblysiphonella steinmanni – or unidentified comparable form
 †Amblysiphonella timorica
 †Ampakabastraea
 †Ampakabastraea cowichanensis
 †Anahamulina
 †Anahamulina wilcoxensis
 †Anatropites
 †Andrazella
 †Angulobracchia
 †Angulobracchia bulbosa
 †Anoptychia
 †Anoptychia oregonensis – type locality for species
 †Antexitus – type locality for genus
 †Antexitus inusitatus – type locality for species
 †Antexitus pessagnoi – type locality for species
 †Antexitus southforkensis – type locality for species
 †Antexitus yangi – type locality for species
 †Anthostylis
 †Anthostylis acanthophora – or unidentified comparable form
 †Antiquilima
 †Apiotrigonia
 †Apiotrigonia condoni
 †Arcavicula – tentative report
  †Arcestes
 †Arcestes gigantogaleatus – or unidentified comparable form
 †Archaeocenosphaera
 †Archaeocenosphaera laseekensis
 †Archaeodictyomitra
 †Archaeodictyomitra exigua
 †Archaeodictyomitra primigena
 †Archaeohagiastrum
 †Archaeohagiastrum munitum – or unidentified related form
 †Archaeohagiastrum oregonense – type locality for species
 †Archaeospongoprunum
 †Archaeospongoprunum helense
 †Archaeospongoprunum praeimlayi
 †Arietoceltites
  Astarte
 †Astraeomorpha
 †Astraeomorpha confusa
 †Astraeomorpha crassisepta
 †Austrisaturnalis
 †Austrisaturnalis quadriradiatus – or unidentified related form

B

 †Baccanella
 †Badouxia
 †Badouxia canadensis – type locality for species
 †Badouxia columbiae
 †Barbuta
 †Barbuta senecaensis – type locality for species
 †Bennettazhia
 †Bennettazhia oregonensis – type locality for species
 †Bistarkum
 †Bistarkum bifurcum – type locality for species
 †Bistarkum rigidium – type locality for species
 †Bistarkum saginatum – type locality for species
 †Broctus
 †Broctus ruesti – type locality for species
 †Buchia
 †Buchia pacifica
 †Buchia piochii
 †Buchia uncitoides – or unidentified comparable form
 †Bulbocyrtium
 †Bulbocyrtium tubum – type locality for species

C

 Cadulus
   †Calycoceras
 †Calycoceras naviculare – type locality for species
 †Camptonectes
 †Canelonus
 †Canelonus conus – or unidentified comparable form
 †Canoptum
 †Canoptum anulatum
 †Canoptum artum – type locality for species
 †Canoptum macoyense – or unidentified comparable form
 †Canoptum merum
 †Canoptum poissoni
 †Canoptum praeanulatum
 †Canoptum spinosum – type locality for species
 †Cantalum
 †Canutus
 †Canutus fusus – type locality for species
 †Canutus giganteus
 †Canutus indomitus
 †Canutus nitidus – type locality for species
 †Canutus rockfishensis
 †Capnodoce
 †Capnodoce anapetes – or unidentified related form
 †Capnodoce angusta – type locality for species
 †Capnodoce antiqua – type locality for species
 †Capnodoce baldiensis – type locality for species
 †Capnodoce beaulieui – type locality for species
 †Capnodoce copiosa – type locality for species
 †Capnodoce extenta – type locality for species
 †Capnodoce fragilis – type locality for species
 †Capnodoce gracilis – type locality for species
 †Capnodoce insueta – type locality for species
 †Capnodoce kochi – type locality for species
 †Capnodoce malaca – type locality for species
 †Capnodoce media – type locality for species
 †Capnodoce minuscula – type locality for species
 †Capnodoce minuta – type locality for species
 †Capnodoce sinuosa – type locality for species
 †Capnodoce traversi
 †Capnuchosphaera
 †Capnuchosphaera colemani – type locality for species
 †Capnuchosphaera deweveri
 †Capnuchosphaera schenki – type locality for species
 †Capnuchosphaera silviesensis – type locality for species
 †Capnuchosphaera smithorum – type locality for species
 †Capnuchosphaera sockensis – type locality for species
 †Capnuchosphaera soldierensis – type locality for species
 †Capnuchosphaera texensis – type locality for species
 Cardinia
 †Cardinioides
 †Cardinioides josephus
 †Cassianella
 †Cassianella angusta
 †Catoma – type locality for genus
 †Catoma concinna – type locality for species
 †Catoma geometrica – type locality for species
 †Catoma inedita – type locality for species
  †Cenoceras
 †Cenoceras lupheri – type locality for species
 †Ceriostella
 †Charlottea
 †Charlottea carterae – type locality for species
 †Charlottea weedensis – or unidentified comparable form
 Chlamys
 †Chlamys mojsisovicsi
 †Chondrocoenia
 †Chondrocoenia paradoxa
  †Cleoniceras – tentative report
 †Cleoniceras dilleri – type locality for species
 †Coccophyllum – tentative report
 †Coelastarte
 †Coenastraea
 †Coenastraea hyatti
 †Colospongia
 †Colospongia utriculus
 †Corum
 †Corum candidum – type locality for species
 †Corum parvum – type locality for species
 †Crassistella
 †Crassistella juvavica
 †Crassistella vesiculosa – or unidentified comparable form
 †Crenamussium
 †Crenamussium concentricum
    †Crioceratites
 †Crubus
 †Crubus chengi – type locality for species
 †Crubus firmus – type locality for species
 †Crucella
 †Crucella angulosa – or unidentified comparable form
 †Crucella beata – type locality for species
 †Crucella concinna – type locality for species
 †Crucella jadeae – type locality for species
 †Crucella theokaftensis – or unidentified comparable form
 †Cryptocoelia
 †Cuifastraea
 †Cuifastraea granulata
 †Cyathocoenia
 †Cyathocoenia gerthi – or unidentified comparable form

D

 Dentalium
 †Dentalium stentor
 †Diceratigalea
 †Diceratigalea mirus
 †Diceratigalea venustus
 †Dichotomites
 †Diplotremina
 †Discamphiceras
 †Discamphiceras ornatum – type locality for species
 †Discosiphonella
 †Discotropites
 †Distichophyllia
 †Distichophyllia norica
 †Droltus
 †Droltus probosus
 †Droltus sanignacioensis
 †Drulanta
 †Drulanta bella – type locality for species
 †Drulanta pulchra – type locality for species

E

 †Elodium – tentative report
 †Elodium mackenziei
 †Elysastraea
 †Elysastraea profunda
 †Emiluvia
 †Emiluvia bacata – type locality for species
 †Emiluvia brevispina – type locality for species
 †Emiluvia goricanae – type locality for species
 †Emiluvia kozuri – type locality for species
 †Emiluvia oregonensis – type locality for species
 †Emiluvia parvinodosa – type locality for species
 †Emiluvia pessagnoi
 †Empirea
 †Endostoma
 †Entolium
 †Entolium ceruleus – type locality for species
 †Eocomoseris
 †Eocomoseris ramosa
 †Erugonia
 †Erugonia canyonensis

F

 †Fantus
 †Fantus exiguus – type locality for species
 †Fantus schoolhousensis – type locality for species
 †Farcus
 †Farcus graylockensis
 †Farcus kozuri – type locality for species
 †Farcus lepidus – type locality for species
 †Farcus lipidus – or unidentified comparable form
 †Farcus multidorsus – type locality for species
 †Fenestrula
 †Fenestrula jurassica – type locality for species
 †Fenestrula oregonensis – type locality for species
 †Franziceras
 †Franziceras graylockense – type locality for species
 †Frenguelliella – tentative report

G

 †Gablonzeria
 †Gablonzeria profunda
  †Gervillia
 †Gervillia angusta
 †Gorgansium
 †Gorgansium beaverense – type locality for species
 †Gorgansium browni – type locality for species
 †Gorgansium morganense
 †Gorgansium silviesense
 †Gorgansium thayeri – type locality for species
 †Gorgansium vallieri
 †Gorgansium yangi – type locality for species
 †Grammatodon
  †Gryphaea
 †Gryphaea arcuataeformis

H

 †Hagiastrum
 †Hagiastrum macrum – type locality for species
 †Hagiastrum majusculum
 †Hajarispongia
 †Hajarispongia whaleni – type locality for species
 †Halobia
 †Halobia beyrichi
 †Halobia dilatata
 †Halobia halorica
 †Halobia oregonensis – type locality for species
 †Halobia radiata
 †Halobia salinarum
 †Halobia superba
 †Halorella
 †Hannaites
 †Hannaites riddlensis
 †Hannaites truncatus
 †Hannaoceras
 †Hemicryptocapsa
 †Heptastylis
 †Heptastylis aquilae
 †Heptastylis oregonensis
 †Hetalum – type locality for genus
 †Hetalum brevilabrum – type locality for species
 †Higumastra
 †Higumastra angustabraccia – type locality for species
 †Higumastra exigua – type locality for species
 †Higumastra hui – type locality for species
 †Higumastra inflata – or unidentified comparable form
 †Higumastra laxa – type locality for species
 †Higumastra lupheri – type locality for species
 †Higumastra obesabraccia – type locality for species
 †Higumastra transversa
 †Hilarisirex
 †Hilarisirex oregonensis
 †Hiscocapsa
 †Hiscocapsa funatoensis
 †Hiscocapsa matsuokai – type locality for species
 †Hiscocapsa minuta – type locality for species
 †Hollisites
 †Hollisites dichotomus – type locality for species
 †Homoeoparonaella
 †Homoeoparonaella elegans
 †Homoeoparonaella hydensis – type locality for species
 †Homolsomites
 †Homolsomites stantoni
 †Hoplocrioceras
 †Hoplocrioceras remondi – or unidentified comparable form
  †Hoploparia
 †Hoploparia riddlensis – type locality for species
 †Hsuum
 †Hsuum acutum – type locality for species
 †Hsuum belliatulum
 †Hsuum brevicostatum
 †Hsuum gratum – type locality for species
 †Hsuum lucidum – type locality for species
 †Hsuum lupheri
 †Hsuum mirabundum
 †Hsuum modicum – type locality for species
 †Hsuum parasolense
 †Hsuum parvulum – type locality for species
 †Hsuum robustum
 †Hsuum rosebudense
 †Hyphantoceras
 †Hyphantoceras ceratopse – tentative report
 †Hyphantoceras irregulare – tentative report
 †Hypophylloceras
 †Hypophylloceras onoense – or unidentified related form
 †Hypophylloceras onoensis – or unidentified related form

I

 †Icrioma
 †Icrioma praecipua – type locality for species
 †Icrioma transversa – type locality for species
  †Inoceramus
 †Isocyprina

J

 †Jaworskiella
 †Jaworskiella supleiensis – type locality for species
 †Justium – type locality for genus
 †Justium medium – type locality for species
 †Justium novum – type locality for species
 †Justium robustum – type locality for species

K

 †Kahlerosphaera
 †Katroma
 †Katroma angusta – type locality for species
 †Katroma bicornus – type locality for species
 †Katroma clara – type locality for species
 †Katroma inflata – type locality for species
 †Katroma ninstintsi
 †Katroma pinquitudo – or unidentified comparable form
 †Kilianella
 †Kilianella besairiei – or unidentified comparable form
 †Krumbeckiella – tentative report
 †Krumbeckiella timorensis – tentative report
 †Kuhnastraea
 †Kuhnastraea decussata
 †Kuhnastraea incrassata

L

 †Lantus
 †Lantus obesus – type locality for species
 †Lantus sixi – type locality for species
 †Lanubus
 †Lanubus alatus – type locality for species
 †Lanubus dickinsoni
 †Lanubus hattorii – type locality for species
 †Lanubus holdsworthi
 †Lanubus purus
 †Laxuscingula – type locality for genus
 †Laxuscingula obesa
 †Leugeo
 †Leugeo hullae – type locality for species
 †Leugeo ordinarius
 †Leugeo parvispinata
 Lima
 †Lima spinigera
 †Liostrea
 †Liostrea newelli
  †Lissodus
 †Lissodus weltoni – type locality for species
 †Lithiotis
 †Lithiotis problematica
 †Loffa
 †Loffa lepida – type locality for species
 †Loffa vesterensis – type locality for species
  Lopha
 †Lucina
 †Lupherium
 †Lupherium nitidum
 †Lupherium snowshoense
  †Lyelliceras
  †Lytoceras
 †Lytoceras aulaeum

M

 †Maeandrostylis
 †Maeandrostylis grandiseptus – type locality for species
 †Maeandrostylis vancouverensis
  †Mantelliceras
 †Mantelliceras phoenixense – type locality for species
 †Margarastraea
 †Margarastraea pulchra – type locality for species
 †Margarosmilia – report made of unidentified related form or using admittedly obsolete nomenclature
 †Margarosmilia confluens
 †Meleagrinella
 †Metapolygnathus
 †Metapolygnathus nodosus
 Milax
 †Milax alienus
 †Milax flexuosus
 Miliolipora
 †Minetrigonia
 †Minutusolla – type locality for genus
 †Minutusolla yaoi – type locality for species
 
 †Modiolus
 †Monotis
 †Monotis subcircularis
 †Montlivaltia – report made of unidentified related form or using admittedly obsolete nomenclature
 †Multimonilis – type locality for genus
 †Multimonilis pulcher – type locality for species
 †Multimonilis splendidus – or unidentified comparable form
  †Myophorella
 †Myophorella argo – or unidentified comparable form
 †Myophorella freboldi – type locality for species
 †Myophorigonia
 †Myophorigonia kobayashii
 †Mysidiella
 †Mysidiella americana – or unidentified comparable form
 †Mysidiella cordillerana
 †Mysidioptera
 †Mysidioptera spinigera
 †Mysidioptera williamsi

N

 Napora
 †Napora antelopensis
 †Napora aperta – type locality for species
 †Napora baumgartneri
 †Napora bearensis
 †Napora cerromesaensis
 †Napora cosmica – or unidentified related form
 †Napora insolita
 †Napora milleri
 †Napora morganensis
 †Napora opaca
 †Napora proba – type locality for species
 †Napora propria – type locality for species
 †Napora relica – type locality for species
 †Neoconocaryomma – type locality for genus
 †Neoconocaryomma acusspina – type locality for species
 †Neoconocaryomma mixtura – type locality for species
 †Neoconocaryomma tantulimamma – type locality for species
 †Neoconocaryomma tripalmaspina – type locality for species
 †Neogondolella
 †Neowrangellium
 †Neowrangellium pessagnoi – type locality for species
  †Nerinea
 †Nevadaphyllites
 †Nevadaphyllites compressus
 Nodosaria – or unidentified comparable form
 †Noritus
 †Noritus lillihornensis – or unidentified comparable form
 †Noritus pauxillus
 †Noritus tenuis – type locality for species
 Nucinella – or unidentified comparable form

O

 †Occidentocerithium – type locality for genus
 †Occidentocerithium panthalassicum – type locality for species
  †Olcostephanus
 †Olcostephanus pecki
 †Olcostephanus popenoei
 †Ophthalmidium
 †Oppelismilia
 †Orbiculiforma
 †Orbiculiforma densaora – type locality for species
 †Orbiculiforma hexagonaora – type locality for species
 †Orbiculiforma iniqua
 †Orbiculiforma librataspira – type locality for species
 †Orbiculiforma multifora – or unidentified related form
 †Orbiculiforma sentarota – type locality for species
 †Orbiculiformella
 †Orbiculiformella callosa
 †Orbiculiformella trispina – type locality for species
 †Oregoniceras
 †Oregoniceras jacksonense – type locality for species
 †Oregoniceras jillsoni – type locality for species
 †Oregoniceras multicostum
 †Oregoniceras phoenixense – type locality for species
  Ostrea
 †Otoscaphites
 †Otoscaphites perrini
 †Oxytropidoceras

P

 †Pachus – tentative report
  †Pachydiscus
 †Pachydiscus ashlandicus – type locality for species
 †Pachydiscus oregonensis – type locality for species
 †Pachyoncus
 †Pachyoncus crassus – type locality for species
 †Pachyoncus floreus – type locality for species
 †Pachyoncus tumidus
 †Pachyoncus varius
 †Palaeodasycladus – tentative report
 †Palaeosaturnalis
 †Palaeosaturnalis subovalis
 †Palaxius
 †Palinandromeda
 †Palinandromeda fimbria
 †Pamiroseris
 †Pamiroseris meriani
 †Pamiroseris smithi
 †Pantanellium
 †Pantanellium baileyi – type locality for species
 †Pantanellium butonense – type locality for species
 †Pantanellium cumshewaense
 †Pantanellium fosteri
 †Pantanellium foveatum
 †Pantanellium inornatum
 †Pantanellium latum – type locality for species
 †Pantanellium malheurense – type locality for species
 †Pantanellium pinguisfloreus – type locality for species
 †Pantanellium sincerum – type locality for species
 †Pantanellium ultrasincerum
 †Pantanellium vigrassi – type locality for species
 †Pantanellium wui – type locality for species
 †Paradelphinulopsis – type locality for genus
 †Paradelphinulopsis vallieri – type locality for species
 †Paradeningeria – tentative report
 †Paradiscamphiceras
 †Paradiscamphiceras athabascanense
 †Paradiscamphiceras dickinsoni
 †Paradiscamphiceras elkhornense – type locality for species
 †Parahsuum
 †Parahsuum formosum – type locality for species
 †Parahsuum hiconocosta
 †Parahsuum izeense
 †Parahsuum mostleri – type locality for species
 †Parahsuum officerense
 †Parahsuum publicum
 †Parahsuum sporta – type locality for species
 †Parahsuum vizcainoense
 †Parallelodon
 †Parallelodon monobensis – or unidentified comparable form
 †Parasaturnalis
 †Parasaturnalis diplocyclis – type locality for species
 †Parasaturnalis yehae – type locality for species
 †Parasepsagon
 †Parasepsagon variabilis
 †Parentactinia
 †Parentactinia nakatsugawaensis
 †Parentactinosphaera – tentative report
 †Parentactinosphaera longispinosa
 †Paronaella
 †Paronaella araneae
 †Paronaella bona – type locality for species
 †Paronaella curticrassa
 †Paronaella fera – type locality for species
 †Paronaella grahamensis
 †Paronaella kotura
 †Paronaella obesa
 †Paronaella pessagnoi
 †Paronaella pygmaea
 †Paronaella skowkonaensis
 †Paronaella snowshoensis – type locality for species
 †Paronaella venadoensis – or unidentified related form
 †Parvicingula
 †Parvicingula blackhornensis
 †Parvicingula blackhorsensis
 †Parvicingula elegans
 †Parvicingula matura
 †Parvicingula media
 †Parvicingula praeacutum
 †Parvifavus
 †Parvifavus irregularis
 †Parvivacca
 †Parvivacca blomei – or unidentified comparable form
 †Perispyridium
 †Perispyridium apertum – type locality for species
 †Perispyridium darwini
 †Perispyridium dettermani – or unidentified comparable form
 †Perispyridium dumitricai
 †Perispyridium facetum
 †Perispyridium gujohachimanense
 †Perispyridium oregonense – type locality for species
 †Perispyridium schopfi
 †Perispyridium tamarackense
 †Perispyridium whalenae – type locality for species
   †Peronidella
 †Phacelostylophyllum
 †Phacelostylophyllum zitteli
  Pholadomya
  †Phylloceras
 †Phylloceras umpquanum
  †Phyllopachyceras
 †Phyllopachyceras trinitense
 †Phyllopachyceras umpquanum
 †Plafkerium
 †Plafkerium robustum – type locality for species
 †Plagiostoma – tentative report
 †Planiinvoluta
 †Platymya
 †Platymya rockymontana
 †Pleesus
 †Pleesus aptus – type locality for species
 †Pleuromya
 †Pleuronectites
 Plicatula
 †Plicatula hekiensis
 †Poulpus
 †Poulpus haeckeli – type locality for species
 †Poulpus karnicus – type locality for species
 †Poulpus lupheri – type locality for species
 †Praeconocaryomma
 †Praeconocaryomma decora – type locality for species
 †Praeconocaryomma parvimamma
 †Praeconocaryomma splendida – type locality for species
 †Praeconocaryomma whiteavesi
 †Praeconocaryomma yakounensis
 †Praeparvicingula
 †Praeparvicingula burnsensis
 †Praeparvicingula communis
 †Praeparvicingula decora
 †Praeparvicingula grantensis
 †Praeparvicingula inornata
 †Praeparvicingula prisca
 †Praeparvicingula profunda
 †Praeparvicingula schoolhousensis
 †Praeparvicingula sodaensis
 †Praeparvicingula tlellensis
 †Praeparvicingula vera
 †Procyclolites
 †Promathildia
 †Pronoella
 †Pronoella uintahensis
 †Protorcula
 †Protorcula frydai
 †Protunuma
 †Protunuma japonicus
 †Pseudocrucella
 †Pseudocrucella hilara – type locality for species
 †Pseudocrucella ornata – type locality for species
 †Pseudocrucella pecta – type locality for species
 †Pseudocrucella prava
 †Pseudocrucella tangae – type locality for species
 †Pseudoheliodiscus
 †Pseudolimea
 †Pseudolimea naumanni
 †Pseudopantanellium
 †Pseudopantanellium floridum – type locality for species
 †Pseudopoulpus
 †Pseudopoulpus acutipodium – type locality for species
 †Pseudopoulpus deweveri – type locality for species
 †Pseudoristola
 †Pseudoristola faceta – type locality for species
 †Pseudoristola megaglobosa – type locality for species
 †Pseudosaturniforma
 †Pseudosaturniforma minuta
 †Pseudospondylospira
 †Pseudospondylospira perplexa
 †Pseudostylosphaera
 †Pseudostylosphaera japonica
 †Pseudostylosphaera magnispinosa – type locality for species
 †Purpuroidea – report made of unidentified related form or using admittedly obsolete nomenclature
 †Pylostephanidium

Q

 †Quadrisaturnalis – type locality for genus
 †Quadrisaturnalis dickinsoni – type locality for species
 †Quadrisaturnalis grandis – type locality for species
 †Quadrisaturnalis quadratus – type locality for species
 †Quarticella
 †Quarticella ovalis – or unidentified comparable form

R

 †Radium – type locality for genus
 †Radium pessagnoi – type locality for species
 †Recticostastraea – type locality for genus
 †Recticostastraea wallowaensis – type locality for species
 †Renzium – type locality for genus
 †Renzium adversum – type locality for species
 †Renzium webergorum – type locality for species
 †Retiophyllia
 †Retiophyllia dawsoni
 †Retiophyllia norica
 †Retiophyllia oppeli – or unidentified related form
 †Retiophyllia parviseptum
 †Ristola
 †Ristola prisca
 †Ristola reliqua – type locality for species
 †Ristola turpicula
 †Rolumbus
 †Rolumbus beatus – type locality for species
 †Rolumbus hilarus – type locality for species
 †Rolumbus lautus – type locality for species

S

 †Saitoum
 †Saitoum coronarium – or unidentified comparable form
 †Saitoum dickinsoni – type locality for species
 †Saitoum smithi – type locality for species
 †Saitoum thayeri – type locality for species
 †Salzburgia – tentative report
 †Sarasinella
 †Sarasinella densicostata – or unidentified comparable form
 †Sarasinella hyatti
 †Sarasinella subspinosa – or unidentified comparable form
 †Sarla
 †Sarla delicata – type locality for species
 †Sarla externa – type locality for species
 †Sarla formosa – type locality for species
 †Sarla plena – type locality for species
 †Sarla triangulata – type locality for species
 †Sarla vetusta – or unidentified related form
  †Scalarites
 †Scalarites mihoensis
  †Scaphites
 †Scaphites condoni
 †Schistophylloceras
 †Schistophylloceras aulonotum – or unidentified related form
 †Sepsagon
 †Sepsagon longispinosus
 †Septocardia
   †Shastasaurus
 †Shastasaurus pacificus – or unidentified comparable form
 †Silicarmiger
 †Simbirskites
 †Simbirskites elatus – or unidentified related form
 †Simbirskites progrediens – or unidentified related form
 †Sontonaella
 †Sontonaella concinna – type locality for species
 †Sontonaella spongiosa – type locality for species
 †Spinidelphinulopsis – type locality for genus
 †Spinidelphinulopsis whaleni – type locality for species
  †Spitidiscus
 †Spitidiscus oregonensis – type locality for species
 †Spondylospira
 †Spondylospira lewesensis
 †Spondylospira tricosta
 †Spongiomorpha
 †Spongiomorpha acyclica
 †Spongiomorpha gibbosa – or unidentified comparable form
 †Spongiomorpha tenuis
 †Spongocapsula
 †Spongocapsula palmerae
 †Spongostylus
 †Spongostylus carnicus
 †Stauracontium – tentative report
 †Stauracontium trispinosum
 †Stromatomorpha
 †Stuoresia
 †Stuoresia libratosepta – or unidentified comparable form
 †Stylophyllopsis
 †Stylophyllopsis lindstroemi – or unidentified comparable form
 †Stylophyllopsis rudis – or unidentified comparable form
 †Stylophyllum
 †Subprionocyclus
 †Subprionocyclus branneri
 †Subprionocyclus neptuni
 †Subprionocyclus normalis – type locality for species
 †Sympolycyclus
 †Syringocapsa
 †Syringocapsa turgida

T

 †Tardentactinia
 †Tardentactinia oregonensis – type locality for species
 †Teichertus
 †Teichertus pessagnoi – type locality for species
 †Teichertus splendidus
 †Telacapsula – type locality for genus
 †Telacapsula johndayensis – type locality for species
 †Telacapsula littlescottyensis – type locality for species
 †Telacapsula odoghertyi – type locality for species
 †Telacapsula wangi – type locality for species
 †Tetraditryma
 †Tetraditryma coldspringensis
 †Tetraditryma corralitosensis
 †Tetraditryma pseudoplena
 †Tetragonites
 †Tetragonites glabrus
 †Tetragonites jacksonense – type locality for species
 †Tetrarchiplagia
 †Tetrarchiplagia yehae
 †Tetratrabs
 †Tetratrabs acutusspina – type locality for species
 †Tetratrabs izeensis – type locality for species
 †Tetratrabs robustusspina – type locality for species
  †Thamnasteria
 †Thamnasteria borealis
 †Thamnasteriamorpha
 †Thamnasteriamorpha frechi
 †Thecomeandra
 †Thecomeandra vallieri
 †Thecosmilia – report made of unidentified related form or using admittedly obsolete nomenclature
 †Thurmanniceras
 †Thurmanniceras jenkinsi
 †Thurmanniceras stippi – or unidentified comparable form
 †Thurmanniceras wilcoxi
 †Thurstonia
 †Thurstonia gibsoni – or unidentified comparable form
 †Tolypammina
 †Tosapecten
 †Tosapecten subhiemalis
 †Tozerium
 †Tragodesmoceras
 †Tragodesmoceras ashlandicum
 †Triactoma
 †Triactoma rosespitensis
 †Triassocampe
 †Triassocampe exilis – type locality for species
 †Triassocampe illyrica
 †Triassocampe immaturum
 †Triassocampe pulchra – or unidentified comparable form
 †Triassocampe sulovensis
 †Triassocingula
 †Triassocyrtium – tentative report
   †Trigonia
 †Trigonia montanaensis
 †Trillus
 †Trillus elkhornensis
 †Trillus seidersi – type locality for species
 †Tripocyclia
 †Tripocyclia brooksi
 †Tripocyclia smithi
 †Tripocyclia southforkensis
 †Tripocyclia wickiupensis
 †Tritrabs
 †Tritrabs simplex
 †Tritrabs suavis
 †Tritrabs worzeli – or unidentified comparable form
 †Triversus
 †Triversus fastigatus
 Trochocyathus
 †Trochocyathus oregonensis – type locality for species
 †Tropites
 †Turanta
 †Turanta fida – type locality for species
 †Turanta morinae
 †Turanta nodosa
 †Turristylus
 †Turristylus triadicus – or unidentified related form
   Turritella
 †Turritella buwaldana
 †Tutcheria
 †Tutcheria densestriata
 †Tutcheria densestriatum

U

 †Undularia
 †Unuma – tentative report
 †Unuma unicus – type locality for species
 †Uvanella
 †Uvanella norica

V

 †Vaugonia
 †Vaugonia oregonensis – type locality for species
 †Vaugonia yukonensis – tentative report
 Venericardia
 †Vermiceras
 †Vermiceras mineralense
 †Vermiceras morganense – type locality for species
 †Vermiceras rursicostatum – or unidentified related form
 †Verticiplagia
 †Verticiplagia oregonensis – type locality for species
 †Verticiplagia verticillata
 †Verticiplagia yehae

W

 †Wallowaconcha
 †Wallowaconcha raylenea
 †Wallowanerita – type locality for genus
 †Wallowanerita newtonae – type locality for species
 †Wellsia
 †Wellsia oregonensis
 †Wellsia packardi
 †Wellsia vigorosa
 †Weyla
 †Williriedellum
 †Williriedellum frequens
 †Wilvemia
 †Wrangellium
 †Wrangellium izeense – type locality for species
 †Wrangellium oregonense – type locality for species
 †Wrangellium thurstonense – or unidentified comparable form

X

 †Xiphostylus
 †Xiphostylus communis – type locality for species
 †Xiphostylus fragilis
 †Xiphostylus halli
 †Xiphostylus logdellensis
 †Xiphostylus simplus – type locality for species
 †Xiphostylus sinuosus
 †Xiphostylus superbus
 †Xiphostylus vallieri
 †Xiphostylus whalenae
 †Xiphotheca
 †Xiphothecaella
 †Xiphothecaella longa

Y

 †Yamatoum
 †Yeharaia
 †Yeharaia elegans

Z

 †Zardinia – tentative report
 †Zartus
 †Zartus dickinsoni – type locality for species
 †Zartus imlayi – type locality for species
 †Zartus jonesi – type locality for species
 †Zartus jurassicus – type locality for species
 †Zartus praejonesi – type locality for species
 †Zartus thayeri – type locality for species
 †Zoneait – type locality for genus
 †Zoneait nargorum – type locality for species
 †Zugmayerella
 †Zugmayerella americana – type locality for species
 †Zugmayerella uncinata

References
 

Mesozoic
Oregon